The Great Synagogue of Warsaw was one of the grandest synagogues constructed in Poland in the 19th century. At the time of its opening, it was the largest Jewish house of worship in the world. It was located on Tłomackie street in Warsaw.

The synagogue served the acculturated elite of Warsaw's Jewry. Like other such prayer houses in Central and Eastern Europe, its worship was conducted in a relatively modernized fashion, although it did not approach ideological religious reform. Sermons were delivered in Polish rather than Yiddish, an all-male choir accompanied the service, and an organ had been installed, which played only at weddings. Liturgy and other principled issues remained wholly untouched.

It was opened on 26 September 1878 in celebration of Rosh Hashanah (Jewish New Year).

It was blown up personally by SS-Gruppenführer Jürgen Stroop on 16 May 1943. This was the last act of destruction by the Germans in suppressing the Revolt of the Jewish ghetto in Warsaw.

History
The Great Synagogue was built by the Warsaw's Jewish community between 1875 and 1878 at Tłomackie street, in the south-eastern tip of the district in which the Jews were allowed to settle by the Russian Imperial authorities of Congress Poland. The main architect was Leandro Marconi.

After the Warsaw Ghetto Uprising, on May 16, 1943, the SS blew up the building. It was not rebuilt after the war, when few Jews remained or returned to Warsaw after the Holocaust by the Nazis.

SS-Gruppenführer Jürgen Stroop later recalled:
What a marvelous sight it was. A fantastic piece of theater. My staff and I stood at a distance. I held the electrical device which would detonate all the charges simultaneously. Jesuiter called for silence.  I glanced over at my brave officers and men, tired and dirty, silhouetted against the glow of the burning buildings. After prolonging the suspense for a moment, I shouted: 'Heil Hitler' and pressed the button. With a thunderous, deafening bang and a rainbow burst of colors, the fiery explosion soared toward the clouds, an unforgettable tribute to our triumph over the Jews. The Warsaw Ghetto was no more.  The will of Adolf Hitler and Heinrich Himmler had been done.

Since the 1980s, the site was redeveloped for construction of a large skyscraper, devoted mostly to office space. It was once known as the Golden Skyscraper and is currently commonly referred to as the Blue Skyscraper.

Gallery

See also 
 Nożyk Synagogue
 Moses Schorr

References

External links

 Great Synagogue in Warsaw at Museum of the History of Polish Jews, Virtual Shtetl.
 Pictures of the synagogue

Synagogues completed in 1878
Synagogues in Warsaw
Neoclassical synagogues
Synagogues in Poland destroyed by Nazi Germany
Buildings and structures in Poland destroyed during World War II
1878 establishments in Europe
19th-century religious buildings and structures in Poland